Kenneth Robert Lum, OC DFA (born 1956) is a dual citizen Canadian and American academic, painter, photographer, sculptor, and writer. Working in a number of media including painting, sculpture and photography, his art ranges from conceptual in orientation to representational in character and is generally concerned with issues of identity in relation to the categories of language, portraiture and spatial politics.

Career
Lum received a MFA from University of British Columbia (UBC) in 1985.

Teaching
From 2000 to 2006, Lum was Head of the Graduate Program in Studio Art at the University of British Columbia, where he had taught since 1990, resigning in 2006. Lum joined the faculty of Bard College's Milton Avery Graduate School of the Arts in 2005 and worked at Bard until 2007.  He taught at the École Nationale Supérieure des Beaux-Arts in Paris from 1995 to 1997 while taking leave from UBC.

Lum has also guest taught at the Akademie der Bildenden Kunste or Academy of Fine Arts, Munich, the China Academy of Art in Hangzhou, China, the l'Ecole d'Arts Plastique in Fort de France, Martinique, De Ateliers and the Rijksakademie, both of Amsterdam, the Maine College of Art in Portland, Maine, California College of the Arts in San Francisco and the Banff Centre. In 2012, Lum joined the faculty of the University of Pennsylvania Stuart Weitzman School of Design in Philadelphia. In 2013, he was appointed a Fellow of the Penn Institute for Urban Research. In 2019, he was appointed a University of Pennsylvania Presidential Professor with title Marilyn Jordan Taylor Presidential Professor of Fine Arts.

Awards

While at the University of British Columbia, he was awarded the Killam Award for Outstanding Research in 1998 and garnered a John Simon Guggenheim Fellowship in 1999. In 2003, Lum won both the Distinguished University Professor Award and the Dorothy Somerset Award for Outstanding Achievement in Creative and Performing Art. He was awarded a Hnatyshyn Foundation Visual Arts Award in 2007. Lum was presented with an ArtMoves Special Award from the City of Torun, Poland in 2011. In 2013, Lum won a Vancouver Mayor's Arts Award in the field of Public Art. In 2015, Lum was awarded an Honoris Causa Doctorate degree from Simon Fraser University. In 2017, he was made an Officer of the Order of Canada. In  2018, Lum was awarded a Pew Fellowship from the Pew Center for Arts and Heritage. In 2019, Lum was awarded the Gershon Iskowitz Award and in 2020 a Governor General's Awards in Visual and Media Arts.

Exhibitions

Lum participated in the Carnegie International 1991, Sydney Biennale in 1995, the São Paulo Art Biennial in 1997, the Shanghai Biennale in 2000 where he also helped edit the exhibition catalog, and at Documenta XI in 2002. Other exhibitions include Johannesburg Biennale 1997, Liverpool Biennial 2006, Tang Contemporary Art (Beijing), Istanbul Biennial 2007 and the 2008 Gwangju Biennale (Gwangju, South Korea) and Arrow Factory Beijing in 2010. A retrospective survey of Lum's work opened in February 2011 at the Vancouver Art Gallery. Lum participated and gave a presentation at the Moscow Biennale 2011. In 2014, he exhibited at the Rosenwald-Wolf Gallery of the University of the Arts (Philadelphia). The Whitney Museum of American Art invited Lum to exhibit as part of the 2014 Whitney Biennial. In 2018, he exhibited in a survey exhibition at the Wattis Institute for Contemporary Arts in San Francisco. In 2022, due to Lum's being a recipient of the Gershon Iskowitz Prize (2019), the exhibition Ken Lum: Death and Furniture was held at the Art Gallery of Ontario curated by Xiaoyu Weng and co-organized by the Art Gallery of Ontario and the Remai Modern.

Art service activities
Lum has served on numerous public committees, including directorship of the then non-funded Or Gallery (Vancouver) from 1982 to 1984 and the City of Vancouver's Public Art Committee from 1994 to 1996. He was on the board of directors for the Or Gallery 1992 - 1994, Arts Initiative Tokyo in Japan from 2001 to 2008, the Annie Wong Art Foundation (Hong Kong) from 1998 to 2002 and Centre A: Center for Asian Art (Vancouver) 2002 to 2007.  Lum served on the Vancouver Art Gallery's Master Planning Committee from 2003 to 2004.  In 2010, he sat on the Canada Council advisory committee dedicated to international engagement and served as juror for the City of Vancouver awards for exhibitions assistance. From 2010 to 2012, he served as juror for the Mayor's Art Awards (Vancouver). The same year, he was a presenter at the inaugural Yishu Art Awards held in Xi'an, China. In 2011, Lum served as juror for the Brink Award (Seattle) for emerging North West artists (British Columbia, Washington and Oregon).  From 2011 to 2017, Lum served on the board of the Canada Post Stamp Advisory Committee in Ottawa, Ontario.  From 2011 to 2012, Lum served as a board member of The Power Plant Contemporary Art Gallery (Toronto).

In 2003, Lum was a juror for the Prix de Rome prize for the Netherlands in the category of Art in Public Space for the Rijksakademie of Amsterdam, writing the Prix de Rome essay for the catalog accompanying the prize. From 2007 - 2012, he served on the advisory board of Fillip, a critical art and cultural journal based in Vancouver. In 2008, Lum was a juror for the Chinese Contemporary Art Awards in Beijing to which he also wrote an essay on the winning artist Liu Wei and juror for the New Contemporaries Exhibition in London, UK. Lum was a juror of the inaugural Lola Award for Contemporary Dance (Vancouver) in 2012. From 2013 to 2015, Lum was a board member of CACHET (Canadian Art Commons for History of Art Education and Training), a three-year project of the University of Toronto's University College Canadian Studies program. In 2015, Lum was a juror for the Jerome Emerging Artists Fellowship in Minneapolis, Minnesota. In 2017, he was a juror of the AIMIA/AGO photography prize. In 2019, Lum served as a juror for the King Salman Park project in Riyadh, Saudi Arabia.

Writings
In 1997, Lum was a keynote speaker for the Universities Art Association of Canada annual conference. Lum was keynote speaker of the third and final symposium of the 15th Biennale of Sydney 2006. In 2010, he was keynote speaker for the annual CIMAM World Museums conference held at the Shanghai Art Museum in Shanghai, China. On January 17, 2020, Lum gave the keynote address for the inauguration of the Melly multi-purpose venue in Rotterdam, The Netherlands. On October 13, 2020 he gave the keynote address for the Becoming Public Art virtual conference, Markham, Ontario.

From 1999 to 2001, Lum wrote an online journal for LondonArt, which chronicled both his passion for and misgivings about art. He co-founded Yishu Journal of Contemporary Chinese Art in 2000, along with Zheng Shengtian, and was Editor-in-Chief until 2004.  With Zheng Shengtian, he co-organized the first large scale international curators' tour of China in 2000, which included curators for Documenta, Dia Art Foundation, Renaissance Society, Museum Boijmans Van Beuningen, Gate Foundation and the Art Gallery of Ontario.

He has written numerous essays with themes ranging from the relationship of art to ethnology for the National Museum of Ethnology, Leiden, Netherlands, to the art of Chen Zhen for the Kunsthalle Wien (Vienna Kunsthalle).  Other essays include a historical analysis of Canadian Cultural Policy, and one concerning issues of multiple identities in respect to Théodore Géricault's The Raft of the Medusa, a paper which was presented to the Department of Caribbean Studies at Yale University.  In 2008, Lum completed an art book project with French philosopher Hubert Damisch. Titled Ultimo Bagaglio, it was created by Three Star Books of Paris. In 2009, Lum contributed an essay regarding the problems confronting art education today for Art School: (Propositions for the 21st Century) published by MIT Press. In 2012, coinciding with his move to Philadelphia, Lum began writing a quarterly art column for Canadian Art magazine. In 2013, he presented a paper for publication on contemporary art versus visual culture for M+ Museum of Visual Culture of the West Kowloon Cultural District of Hong Kong. He also presented a paper on the work of conceptual artist Ian Wilson at the Dia Art Foundation in New York. In 2016, Lum contributed a catalog essay for the Museum of Contemporary Art Cleveland.  The book and catalog for the exhibition and project "Monument Lab: Creative Speculations for Philadelphia" was issued in the fall of 2019 by Temple University Press.  A book of writings titled, "Everything is Relevant: Writings on Art and Life, 1991 - 2018" was released by Concordia University Press in early 2020.https://www.concordia.ca/press/everythingisrelevant.html. In 2020, he completed a screenplay about comparative racism in the aftermath of the American Civil War.

Curatorial
Lum's activities include several curatorial projects.  He was Director of the non-profit and then non-funded Or Gallery in Vancouver from 1982 to 1984.  While Or Gallery Director, he curated PoCo Rococo, an exhibition held in Coquitlam Mall, a large suburban shopping centre.  The exhibition included high school art students of Coquitlam and Port Coquitlam with established city artists.  In 2001, Lum was part of a team that founded a Humanities 101 educational lectures program for low income people in Vancouver's Downtown Eastside. Lum was an advisor for The Short Century: Independence and Liberation Movements in Africa 1945 to 1994, a 2001 exhibition conceived and curated by Okwui Enwezor.  Lum was curator of the 2004 NorthWest Annual for the Center of Contemporary Art in Seattle.  In 2005, Lum co-curated Shanghai Modern 1919-1945, an exhibition about the city's art and culture during the republican era. He contributed an essay for the exhibition on the topic of Aesthetic Education in China. The same year, he also co-curated and contributed an essay for the 7th Sharjah Biennial in The Emirate of Sharjah, United Arab Emirates, the largest international contemporary art biennale in the Middle East. In 2015, along with Paul Farber and A. Will Brown, Lum co-conceived and co-curated Monument Lab: Creative Speculations for Philadelphia, a public art and urban research project sited in the courtyard of Philadelphia City Hall.  The project consisted of a specially designed research pavilion, a prototype monument by artist Terry Adkins, and free dialogues led by Philadelphia artists and critical thinkers using William Penn's iconic plan for the city's five public squares as inspiration.

Public art
Lum has worked on several public art projects. In Vienna in 2000, Lum realized a 540 square metre work on the side of the centrally located Kunsthalle Wien for the non-profit art initiative museum in progress. The work, There is no place like home, generated controversy as Lum saw the work as a response to the growth of the extreme right in Europe. 
Lum's Four Boats Stranded: Red and Yellow, Black and White was installed upon the roof of the Vancouver Art Gallery in 2001. The work, which can be viewed as a comment on immigration and acculturation, features four model boats: a First Nations longboat, a cargo ship, the steam liner Komagata Maru, and George Vancouver's ship HMS Discovery. Each vessel has been placed at one of the building's compass points—north, south, east, and west—and painted in a colour intended to reflect the stereotyped racial vision presented in the hymn "Jesus Loves the Little Children".

Lum realized a second permanent public art commission outside St. Moritz, Switzerland in 2003 that dealt with the declining Romansch way of life in the remote Engadine region of Switzerland. The work titled Il Buolf Mus-chin Museum was a commission of the Walter A. Bechtler Foundation of Zurich and the Zürcher Hochschule der Künste.

In 2005, Lum completed A Tale of Two Children: A Work for Strathcona, a permanent work commissioned by the City of Vancouver's Public Works Yard.  Another major public art commission by Lum, sponsored by the city of Vienna, Austria, and Wiener Linien (Vienna Public Transit), opened in downtown Vienna in January 2007.  Titled Pi, the work is over 130 meter long and situated in a prominent pedestrian passageway by Vienna's Karlsplatz subway interchange. In 2011, Lum realized a permanent public art commission for the city of Utrecht, Netherlands. The work is located in the Nieuw Welgelegen district, a troubled but dynamic multi-ethnic area of Utrecht that is undergoing redevelopment.  The work titled January 1, 1960 consists of a monumentally scaled topographical and political globe of the world as it looked at the start of the year 1960.

In early 2010, Lum completed Monument for East Vancouver, colloquially known as the East Van Cross, an outdoor artwork located in the traditionally working class side of Vancouver.  In Vancouver, he also realized From shangri-la to shangri-la, a temporary installation based on huts that were erected on the Maplewood mudflats in North Vancouver during the second half of the twentieth century. Scale models of these structures appear to float over the surface of a corporate reflecting pond, creating a marked juxtaposition between their makeshift construction and the surrounding architecture, while evoking the utopian character of the mudflat community in the seemingly inexorable advance of urban development. In mid-2010, Lum won a public art commission for Across Time and Space, Two Children of Toronto Meet in Toronto, Ontario which was completed in 2013. Late in 2010, Lum was selected lead artist on the design team for the new Walterdale Bridge replacement scheduled for construction from 2013 to 2017 in Edmonton, Alberta. Lum completed in 2013 public art commissions premised on the tragic-historical figures of Homer Plessy and Dred Scott as a connecting narrative between the Laumeier Sculpture Park in St Louis, Missouri and Longue Vue House and Gardens in New Orleans, Louisiana. In 2016, Lum completed a memorial to the Canadian war effort in Italy during World War II  Lum's memorial centered on the Battle of Ortona where Canadian troops were victorious but suffered heavy losses. The memorial is sited in Nathan Phillips Square by Toronto City Hall. Lum won a commission in 2016 to design a memorial to the 1986 Lake Nyos disaster in Cameroon. The memorial is to be sited by Lake Nyos.  A large public art project for the block 13 development in North York, Toronto was completed in the spring of 2019.

References

External links 
http://www.kenlumart.com
Ken Lum at L.A.Galerie - Frankfurt
Ken Lum at Misa Shin
Ken Lum at Nagel-Draxler - Berlin
"East Van. No Rules." by Mike Klassen in City Focus

1956 births
Living people
20th-century Canadian painters
20th-century Canadian sculptors
20th-century Canadian male artists
21st-century Canadian painters
21st-century Canadian sculptors
Artists from Vancouver
Bard College faculty
Canadian contemporary painters
Canadian essayists
Canadian expatriate academics in the United States
Canadian male painters
Canadian male sculptors
Canadian multimedia artists
Canadian people of Chinese descent
Canadian photographers
Officers of the Order of Canada
University of British Columbia alumni
Academic staff of the University of British Columbia
University of Pennsylvania faculty
21st-century Canadian male artists
Governor General's Award in Visual and Media Arts winners